Kaj Jægergaard (born 11 September 1959) is a Danish wrestler. He competed in the men's Greco-Roman 74 kg at the 1980 Summer Olympics.

References

External links
 

1959 births
Living people
Danish male sport wrestlers
Olympic wrestlers of Denmark
Wrestlers at the 1980 Summer Olympics
People from Ringsted
Sportspeople from Region Zealand